The 1980 North Indian Ocean cyclone season was part of the annual cycle of tropical cyclone formation. The season has no official bounds but cyclones tend to form between April and December. These dates conventionally delimit the period of each year when most tropical cyclones form in the northern Indian Ocean. There are two main seas in the North Indian Ocean—the Bay of Bengal to the east of the Indian subcontinent and the Arabian Sea to the west of India. The official Regional Specialized Meteorological Centre in this basin is the India Meteorological Department (IMD), while the Joint Typhoon Warning Center (JTWC) releases unofficial advisories. An average of five tropical cyclones form in the North Indian Ocean every season with peaks in May and November. Cyclones occurring between the meridians 45°E and 100°E are included in the season by the IMD.



Systems
There were 14 depressions during the season. The first depression lasted from May 15–19, moving from the central Bay of Bengal eastward to the Nicobar Islands. The second depression existed from June 4–6 off the west coast of India. On June 21, a land depression developed over central India, moving offshore into the Arabian Sea and dissipating on June 26. There were three land depressions in August, as well as one in September. Another depression developed in the northern Bay of Bengal on September 16 and moved northwestward through India, dissipating on September 26. Another depression developed in the Bay of Bengal on October 1, striking Bangladesh three days later. On October 14, a depression developed in the central Arabian Sea and moved westward, passing near Socotra on October 17; it moved into the Gulf of Aden a day later.

Tropical Storm One (1B)

The first storm of the season began its life on October 10 in the Bay of Bengal. It executed an anticyclonic loop to the west, and became a tropical storm before hitting eastern Sri Lanka on the 17th. It continued westward, and ultimately dissipated over the Arabian Sea on the 20th.

Tropical Storm Two (2B)

On October 18, a storm equivalent with windspeed of 85 kmph hit the state of Andhra Pradesh, dissipating the next day.

Tropical Storm Three (3A)

The monsoon trough spawned a tropical depression off the western Indian coast on November 12. It tracked generally northwestward, slowly organizing into a tropical storm on the 17th. The storm turned to the northeast, where it dissipated over the northeastern Arabian Sea.

Tropical Storm Four (4B)

A storm of unknown intensity persisted in the western Bay of Bengal from December 3 to the 7th, remaining well offshore of any landmass.

Tropical Storm Five (5B)

The last storm of the season formed in the central Bay of Bengal on December 12. It moved east-southeastward, then turned to the west where it briefly became a tropical storm. The storm struck eastern Sri Lanka, and dissipated over the island on the 17th.

See also

North Indian Ocean tropical cyclone
1980 Atlantic hurricane season
1980 Pacific hurricane season
1980 Pacific typhoon season
Australian cyclone seasons: 1979–80, 1980–81
South Pacific cyclone seasons: 1979–80, 1980–81
South-West Indian Ocean cyclone seasons: 1979–80, 1980–81

References

External links
India Meteorological Department
Joint Typhoon Warning Center 

 
1980 NIO